John Baptist Mary David, S.S., (June 4, 1761 – July 12, 1841) was a French-born prelate of the Roman Catholic Church in the United States. He served as bishop of the Diocese of Bardstown in Kentucky from 1832-33.

Biography
David was born in Couëron, in the Province of Brittany (now the Department of Loire-Atlantique) in pre-revolutionary France. At age 7 he was placed under the care of his uncle, a priest, who instructed the boy in Latin, French, and music. 

He entered the nearby college of the Oratorians at age 14, and later the seminary of the Diocese of Nantes, receiving the tonsure in 1778. Ordained a priest on September 24, 1785, he joined the Society of Saint-Sulpice (commonly known as the Sulpicians) and taught philosophy, theology, and Scripture at the Sulpician seminary in Angers from 1786 until 1790, when the French Revolution forced him to seek shelter in the private home of a Catholic family.

In January 1792, seeking safety, David was part of a small group of Sulpicians who left France for the United States, under the leadership of the Abbé Benedict Joseph Flaget, S.S., landing in Baltimore, Maryland in March. He was first sent by Bp. John Carroll to serve the Catholics of southern Maryland in Bryantown and missions in Charles County. While professor of philosophy at Georgetown College (1804–06), he continued to serve as a missionary to southern Maryland. He was the professor of theology at St. Mary's Seminary (1806–10) in Baltimore, where he was also acting president during 1810-11.

In 1810 he moved west to serve under his colleague, Flaget, now the bishop of the Diocese of Bardstown, Kentucky, where he established St. Thomas Seminary. In 1812 he founded the Sisters of Charity of Nazareth, whose Superior General he remained almost to the end of his life.

On July 4, 1817, David was appointed Coadjutor Bishop of Bardstown and Titular Bishop of Maurocastrum by Pope Pius VII. He received his episcopal consecration on August 15, 1819 (the two-year-long delay due to his reluctance to accept his nomination) from Bishop Flaget. Following his consecration, he continued to serve as a missionary, superior of St. Thomas' Seminary, and pastor of St. Joseph's Cathedral. David succeeded Flaget as the second Bishop of Bardstown on August 25, 1832. However, he resigned as Bishop less than a year later, on March 17, 1833. His poor health compelled him to retire to the motherhouse of the Sisters of Charity  he had founded in Nazareth, where he later died at age 80 and was buried.

References

Episcopal succession

1761 births
1841 deaths
People from Loire-Atlantique
Breton Roman Catholic priests
French emigrants to the United States
French Roman Catholic missionaries
19th-century Roman Catholic bishops in the United States
Catholic Church in Maryland
Catholic Church in Kentucky
Burials in Kentucky
Religious leaders from Kentucky
Roman Catholic missionaries in the United States